NASCAR is an American auto racing sanctioning body and company.

NASCAR may also refer to:

The NASCAR Cup Series
The NASCAR Xfinity Series
The NASCAR Camping World Truck Series
The NASCAR Whelen Modified Tour
NASCAR playoffs
NASCAR on Fox
NASCAR rules and regulations
NASCAR on television and radio